Lucy Tejada Saenz (October 9, 1920 – November 2, 2011) was a Colombian contemporary painter. She is the sister of Hernando Tejada, another famous Colombian artist.

Life 
Lucy Tejada Saenz was born in Pereira, Colombia on October 9, 1920 and died in Cali, Colombia on November 2, 2011. She came from a family of artists (her brother was the painter Hernando Tejada). She lived in Cali since 1936. After the death of her mother, Lucy moved to Bogota to study at the Javeriana University, and graduated from the School of Fine arts. There she met the also painter Antonio Valencia, that later would be her husband.

She completed her training in the Saint Fernando Arts Academy Log In ‹ Javier Amaya | escritor — WordPress and the School of Graphic Arts of Madrid, Spain. After a trip to the Guajira, in the year 1947, she had her first exhibition. In the 1950s, she traveled for five years around Europe staying in Madrid, Paris and Bucharest, where she discovered the big world museums.

Work 
She has permanent works at the Club Rialto of Pereira, the solo museum of Cali and in the Library Luís Ángel Arango, of Bogota. Her characters, imaginary beings of black and deep eyes live in her paintings, that resemble his world; a beautiful ideal world, inhabited only by women and children. The artistic legacy is a trip by a world knitted of dreams, evocations and original proposals.

Lucy Tejada exhibited her works in America and Europe, receiving several prizes for her work in different national contests without scholarships neither support of the state, always lived off the sale of her works and felt proud of this, as it should be the future of all talented artists of her country.  Lucy Tejada, with the support of her family and close friends, started the Lucy Tejada Foundation, with the aim to conserve and spread her work and the one of Hernando, her brother, memories of Cali that creates and builds possible worlds each day.

At the start of the decade of the 1950s, her work gained big international presence, when she participated at biennial events in Venecia, São Paulo, Mexico, Córdoba-Argentina, Medellín, San Juan-Puerto Rico and Havana-Cuba.

After two weeks in the unit of intensive care at the Clinic of Occidente of Cali, Lucy Tejada died peacefully on November 2, 2011. She was survived by her children Claudia and the also artist Alejandro Valencia Tejada.

Upon Tejada's death, and fulfilling her will, the family delivered to the city of Pereira a very valuable collection of 163 pieces of her work. The works of curation, study and preservation of such collection in preparation to a permanent public exhibition became reality as the Pereira municipality opened officially the Lucy Tejada Museum in 2019 as a tribute and recognition to a lifetime as an artist.

Awards 
 Alejandro Obregón called her "painter of the tenderness". Lucy Tejada showed many times her works in America and Europe, received several prizes, among others the Medal of the Cultural Merit in recognition to her contributions to the Colombian art during more than 50 years, and always lived of the sale of these works.
 National Prize of Painting (1957)
 Prize of Acquisition (1962)
 First place of the Tenth Festival of Art (1970)
 In the year 2008, the Ministry of Culture of Colombia awarded her the Prize "Life and Work", for her contributions and her long career in artistic painting.

Tribute
On 9 October 2018, to commemorate what would have been her 98th birthday, Google released a Google Doodle celebrating her.

Sources 
 Poetic art : anthology, 1942–1976 / Oscar Echeverri Mejía ; [recorded by Lucy Tejada] Echeverri Mejía, Óscar (1918– ) Authors Secun: Tejada, Lucy Publication: [S.l. : s.n., 1978] ([Cali, Colombia] : Imp. Departamental) .177 p.: il.; 24 cm
 Lucy Tejada. Lucy Tejada / texts, Gonzalo Mallarino ... [Et al.]. Publication: [S.l.] : Alejandro Valencia Tejada, 1997 (Cali, Colombia : Printer Feriva) Description: 252 p. : ill. (some Cabbage.) ; 28 cm. 
 Lucy Tejada, retrospective, 1949–1982 of Lucy Tejada; National Museum of Colombia. Publication: Bogota : Colombian Institute of Culture, [1983]
 The World of Lucy Tejada. Beatriz Uribe de Urdinola: Lucy Tejada: Retrospective 1951 – 1992. Publications Wall, 1993.
 Medellín Forero, Carlos; Meneghetti, ArstidesLucy Tejada: "an art of submission to inner norms" / Carlos Medellín Forero in Magazine: Bogota cultural and bibliographic bulletin: Bank of the Republic, Library Luis Angel Arango – 1:9 (1958:oct.) 320

See also 
 Culture of Colombia
 Santiago of Cali Art and culture
 Valley of the Cauca

References 

1920 births
2011 deaths
20th-century Colombian painters
20th-century Colombian women artists
21st-century Colombian women artists
People from Pereira, Colombia
Sibling artists